Euxesta argentina is a species of ulidiid or picture-winged Fly in the genus Euxesta of the family Ulidiidae.

References

argentina
Insects described in 1904